William Joseph Cheek (born June 22, 1979) is an American former speed skater and inline speed skater. He specialized in the short and middle distances and won Olympic gold in 2006. Currently Cheek is a media entrepreneur.

Accomplishments
Cheek's breakthrough was in the 2002 Winter Olympics in Salt Lake City, where he won the bronze medal in the 1,000 meters.

In 2003 he won a bronze medal at the World Single Distance Championships in Berlin in the 1,000- and 1,500-meter events. Both distances at that tournament were won by Dutch speed skater Erben Wennemars. In 2005, Cheek made the podium for the first time in the World Sprint Championships, again behind Wennemars.

On January 22, 2006, in Heerenveen, Cheek became world sprint champion. On aggregate he beat Dmitry Dorofeyev of Russia and Jan Bos of the Netherlands.

At the 2006 Winter Olympics in Turin, Italy, Cheek won the men's 500-meter event in dominating style, recording a two-run total time of 1:09.76. That time was 0.65 seconds faster than runner-up Dorofeyev, and Cheek was the only competitor to break the 35-second mark in the competition, doing so in both of his runs (34.82 and 34.94). He went on to win silver in the 1,000-meter race, finishing just behind teammate Shani Davis.

Cheek was elected by his teammates to carry the US flag into the closing ceremonies. Near the end of NBC's coverage of the event, commentator Bob Costas noted that Cheek's application to Harvard University had not been accepted and lobbied the Dean of Admissions to reconsider the decision. Cheek has since graduated from Princeton University. At Princeton, Cheek was a member of the Ivy Club

Cheek planned to attend the Beijing 2008 Olympic Games in support of athletes on Team Darfur. His visa was revoked by the Chinese embassy hours before he intended to leave for China.

Personal life
Joey Cheek was born on June 22, 1979, in Greensboro, North Carolina. He picked up speed skating after meeting and watching neighborhood friend Bryan Anderson skate around the neighborhood training for Nationals. After years of skating with Bryan, his brother, and other Piedmont skaters he switched to ice speed skating. He did this by attending a "from wheels to ice" class in Alaska.

Cheek attended James B. Dudley High School in Greensboro, North Carolina, and graduated from Princeton University as a member of the class of 2011, where he studied economics and the Chinese language.

Philanthropy
Cheek is the co-founder and president of Team Darfur, an international coalition of athletes committed to raising awareness about and bringing an end to the crisis in Darfur, Sudan.

At a press conference after the Olympic 500-meter race, Cheek said that he decided to donate his USOC gold medal bonus ($25,000) to Right to Play, an athlete-driven international humanitarian organization formed by former Olympic champion Johann Olav Koss of Norway. Cheek challenged others to make similar pledges to the organization. He subsequently donated his prize money from the 1,000-meter race ($15,000) to the same organization.

Since his donation others have joined in and over $390,000 has been contributed to this cause.

References

External links
 
 
 
 Official site
 

1979 births
Sportspeople from Greensboro, North Carolina
Living people
American male speed skaters
Olympic bronze medalists for the United States in speed skating
Olympic gold medalists for the United States in speed skating
Olympic silver medalists for the United States in speed skating
Speed skaters at the 2002 Winter Olympics
Speed skaters at the 2006 Winter Olympics
Medalists at the 2002 Winter Olympics
Medalists at the 2006 Winter Olympics
Princeton University alumni
American activists